Juozas Jurgėla (August 11, 1911 – May 2, 1961) was a Lithuanian basketball player. He won gold medal at EuroBasket 1939 with Lithuania national basketball team.

Biography
Studied in Kaunas, from 1925 played basketball in Kaunas Grandis club. As a member of Grandis club he won third place during the first Lithuania nation Olympics. He was invited to Lithuania national basketball team twice (1937, Riga and 1939, Kaunas). He won gold medal at EuroBasket 1939. Noted for mature and tactical play making.

After the end of the World War II, he moved to Germany, and later to United States.

Sources
 United States of America Lithuanians (Jungtinių Amerikos Valstijų lietuviai) – Science and encyclopedia publishing center, Vilnius, 1998
 Vidas Mačiulis, Vytautas Gudelis. Halė, kurioje žaidė Lubinas ir Sabonis. 1939–1989 – Respublikinis sporto kombinatas, Kaunas, 1989

Lithuanian men's basketball players
FIBA EuroBasket-winning players
1911 births
1961 deaths
Lithuanian emigrants to the United States